The NCAA 3x3 Basketball championship was introduced in 2017–2018 season as a special event, with Letran and JRU winning the inaugural tournament for 14U and 18U. As a special event, the championship will not be included in the General Championship tally.

Results

Number of championships by school

See also
 UAAP 3x3 basketball championship

References

External links

Basketball list
NCAA